Aleksis Kivi (1995–96) is an opera in two acts by Einojuhani Rautavaara, to a libretto by the composer. It was first performed by the Savonlinna Opera Festival on 8 July 1997, with Jorma Hynninen in the title role. The opera deals with episodes in the life of Aleksis Kivi, the Finnish national writer. The opera was written at the request of Hynninen.

Recordings
Rautavaara: Aleksis Kivi 2CD 2002 Jorma Hynninen, Lasse Pöysti, Eeva-Liisa Saarinen, Helena Juntunen, Gabriel Suovanen, Marcus Groth, Lassi Virtanen, Jaakko Hietikko Jyväskylä Sinfonia, Markus Lehtinen Ondine Records.
Rautavaara: Aleksis Kivi DVD Jorma Hynninen (Aleksis Kivi), Janne Reinikainen (August Ahlqvist), Riikka Rantanen (Charlotta), Pauliina Linnosaari (Hilda), Ville Rusanen (Young Alexis) & Tobias Zilliacus (J.L. Runeberg) Finnish National Opera Orchestra, conducted Mikko Franck  Ondine

References

Finnish-language operas
1997 operas
Aleksis Kivi
Operas
Operas by Einojuhani Rautavaara
Operas set in Finland
Operas set in the 19th century
Operas about writers
Operas based on real people